Scott Cameron Pelley (born July 28, 1957) is an American journalist and author who has been a correspondent and anchor for CBS News for more than 31 years. Pelley is the author of the 2019 book, Truth Worth Telling, and a correspondent for the CBS News magazine 60 Minutes. Pelley served as anchor and managing editor of the CBS Evening News from 2011 to 2017, a period in which the broadcast added more than a million and a half viewers, achieving its highest ratings in more than a decade. Pelley served as CBS News’s chief White House correspondent from 1997 to 1999.

Early life and education
Born in San Antonio, Texas, Pelley grew up in Lubbock, where he graduated from Coronado High School and obtained his first job in journalism at the age of 15 as a copyboy for the Lubbock Avalanche-Journal. Staying close to home, he majored in journalism at Texas Tech University in Lubbock.

Career

CBS News
Pelley's CBS career started in New York City in 1989. Later, he returned to Dallas to cover national affairs from the CBS bureau. Pelley covered the 1990/91 Gulf war, reporting from Baghdad and traveling with the XVIII Airborne Corps in its assault on Iraq and Kuwait. He was assigned to cover the 1992 presidential campaigns of Ross Perot and Bill Clinton, and also reported on such major events as the 1993 World Trade Center bombing, the Waco Siege, and the Oklahoma City bombing.

Pelley served as CBS News's Chief White House Correspondent from 1997 to 1999. During that time, President Clinton was impeached by the United States House of Representatives. In covering the investigation of the president, Pelley broke the news that Monica Lewinsky had become a cooperating witness in the investigation conducted by the Office of Independent Counsel.

60 Minutes and 60 Minutes II

Pelley reported on the economic collapse of 2008-09, on the wars in Afghanistan and Iraq and reporting on climate change from Antarctica and the Arctic. In 2008, Pelley conducted an interview with Federal Reserve Chairman Ben Bernanke. The interview was the first with a Fed Chairman in decades and broke a long-standing Federal Reserve tradition.

Pelley has reported from Iraq on the front lines in the battle against ISIS; he landed the first major television interview with FBI Director James Comey in 2014; and he conducted an interview of the nurses who treated the first Ebola patient in the United States. Pelley also conducted the only interview with one of the Navy SEALs who helped to kill Osama bin Laden.

In September 2015, Pelley met Pope Francis at the Vatican ahead of the pontiff's visit to the United States, and later led CBS News' coverage of the visit.

War reporting

Starting with the Persian Gulf crisis of 1990 and the 1991 invasion of Iraq, Pelley has reported extensively from many war zones.

In 2006 and 2007 he filed reports on the genocide in the Darfur region of Sudan. In his 2007 report, Pelley enlisted the help of a rebel group to organize an armed reconnaissance into Darfur. The story revealed a village that had been destroyed by government forces in their campaign of genocide.

In Afghanistan, Pelley accompanied numerous units of the U.S. Army and Marine Corps in combat operations and reported independently on the effects of the war on civilians.

Miraculously, Pelley managed to get into Kyiv to interview President of Ukraine, Volodymyr Zelenskyy, for the 60 Minutes segment which aired April 10, 2022 while Kyiv was under siege by Russian forces during the 2022 Russian invasion of Ukraine.

CBS Evening News

Pelley became the anchor of the CBS Evening News on June 6, 2011, succeeding Katie Couric. In Pelley's first nine months in the anchor chair, the program gained an additional daily 821,000 viewers. 
              
Pelley's coverage  of the Trump administration has been recognized by journalists and media evaluators. According to Washington Post media columnist Margaret Sullivan, Pelley's coverage of the Trump administration is an example of "pointed truth telling" that has "set himself apart" from his competitors. Media critic Andrew Tyndall said, "To me, it's not commentary. It's actual reporting."
            
Pelley later told CNN that he had been removed from the anchor chair for complaining to CBS News management about a hostile work environment for the news division's employees. The comments underscore the fallout the network continues to face from the Me Too movement, as CBS Corporation chairman Les Moonves, 60 Minutes executive producer Jeff Fager and CBS This Morning host Charlie Rose have all been dismissed for inappropriate conduct on the job. 

Despite some articles blaming poor ratings when Pelley was relieved of his position, there are several other articles indicating strong ratings and audience growth during Pelley's tenure as CBS Evening News anchor. These tend to give credence to Pelley's assertion that he was let go due to his complaints about a "hostile work environment".

Appraisals

Variety wrote, "For CBS the key was switching to Pelley, the former war reporter and White House correspondent. He took over from Katie Couric and has steadily made up ground ever since." Of 60 Minutes, David Zurawik of The Baltimore Sun wrote in 2007, "If there is a single face of the broadcast, it is now that of Pelley who has done several of the biggest interviews and stories." Allen Neuharth, founder of USA Today, noted that "Pelley threw hardballs" in his 2007 interview with President Bush. Bob Woodward, writing in The Washington Post in 2007, said, "Scott Pelley nailed the crucial question" in his interview with former CIA Director, George Tenet. William F. Buckley, Jr., in the National Review, said "Pelley did fine work" in the Tenet piece. Alessandra Stanley of The New York Times wrote, "the strongest on-air personality of the moment belongs to one of the program's blander faces, Scott Pelley." On Pelley's second anniversary as anchor of the CBS Evening News, the Baltimore Sun praised Pelley and his team for delivering an "honest" newscast.

Variety lauded Pelley as anchor of the CBS Evening News, writing that Pelley "conveys the sense of someone with genuine gravitas and a commitment to his craft, while appearing cool and unflappable in breaking-news situations." In February 2015, the Los Angeles Times praised Pelley's "no frills style" and lauded him for being "all about the journalism." Veteran television writer Stephen Battaglio wrote, "While authenticity has become a hot topic in TV news, Pelley has never needed to invent it or try to enhance it."

Recognition
Pelley is the most awarded correspondent in the history of 60 Minutes. He has won 40 national Emmy Awards from the Academy of Television Arts and Sciences.

In 2020, Pelley and his team were awarded the Alfred I. duPont-Columbia University Award for reporting on the separation of migrant children from their families at the U.S. border. This was Pelley's fourth duPont-Columbia Award.

In 2016, Pelley and his team were awarded the Alfred I. duPont–Columbia University Award for reporting on a nerve gas attack that occurred in the suburbs of Damascus, Syria, in 2013. More than 1,400 civilians were killed. The judges cited "previously unheard testimony and unseen images which bore shocking witness to the 2013 Syrian Sarin gas attacks." 

In 2014, CBS News was recognized with the Alfred I. du Pont-Columbia University Award for its coverage of the mass murder at Sandy Hook Elementary School in Newtown, Connecticut. In their citation the judges wrote, "Scott Pelley's conversation on '60 Minutes' with seven of the families that lost children was remarkable for its courage and candor."

In 2013, Pelley's team of producers, photographers and editors won its third George Foster Peabody Award for an investigation of a fraudulent medical study at Duke University. The report detailed how a star researcher fabricated data in what was thought to be an important breakthrough in cancer treatment.

Pelley and his team earned the 2012 Gerald Loeb Award for Explanatory business journalism for the story "The Next Housing Shock."

In 2011, Pelley's team won the Alfred I. du Pont-Columbia University Award for an investigation into the Deepwater Horizon disaster. The story uncovered the troubled history of the Deepwater Horizon drilling rig in the months and days before the 2010 blowout that killed 11 crewmen and unleashed the largest accidental oil spill in history.

In 2009, Pelley's team won its second George Foster Peabody Award for a report on the medical relief organization Remote Area Medical (RAM). RAM was created to airdrop doctors and supplies into the developing world, but today it does most of its work setting up free medical clinics for the uninsured in the United States.

Also in 2009, Pelley's team won the George Polk Award, the Gerald Loeb Award for Television Enterprise business journalism, and an Investigative Reporters and Editors Award for an investigation of American recycling companies that secretly ship hazardous waste to China. The report exposed an illegal trade that ruins the health of villagers who dismantle discarded computers under medieval conditions.

The Pelley team's reporting on the deaths of civilians during a Marine engagement in Haditha, Iraq, won the 2007 George Foster Peabody Award. The citation for the award said in part, "This thorough, open-minded investigation of the worst single killing of civilians by American troops since Vietnam put not just the incident into better perspective but the entire Iraq War and the terrible choices it presents both soldier and civilian".

The show's reporting on child slavery in India earned 60 Minutes II the Investigative Reporters and Editors award in 1999.

Pelley's team has won eight Edward R. Murrow Awards, which were bestowed by the Radio and Television News Directors Association and three Writers Guild of America Awards.

Pelley is a former co-Chair of the Board of Overseers for the International Rescue Committee, the refugee relief agency headquartered in New York City.

Pelley left Texas Tech without a degree, but he has maintained an ongoing relationship with the university. On March 22, 2013, he was named an Outstanding Alumnus of Texas Tech University, the highest honor bestowed by Texas Tech Alumni Association. Pelley was inducted into the Texas Tech University College of Media and Communication Hall of Fame in 2006. He currently serves on the professional advisory board of the university's College of Media and Communication.

In 2010, Pelley was named to Salon.com's "Men on Top" list alongside Conan O'Brien, Tom Hardy, and Mark Ronson. "He restores a little of our faith in TV news," writes Salon.com, "while performing hugely important, world-bettering reports along the way."

In 2016, Pelley was honored with the Walter Cronkite Award for Excellence in Journalism.

Personal life
In 1983, Pelley married Jane Boone, a former television reporter and advertising executive. They have a son and a daughter.

See also
 New Yorkers in journalism

References

External links

 Scott Pelley's bio at CBSnews.com
 
 

1957 births
Living people
60 Minutes correspondents
American people of the Iraq War
American television news anchors
American television reporters and correspondents
American war correspondents
CBS News people
Coronado High School (Lubbock, Texas) alumni
Gerald Loeb Award winners for Explanatory
Gerald Loeb Award winners for Television
Journalists from New York City
People from Lubbock, Texas
Texas Tech University alumni
War correspondents of the Iraq War
Journalists from Texas
20th-century American journalists
American male journalists
21st-century American journalists